Geoffrey Bennington (born 1956) is Asa Griggs Candler Professor of French and Professor of Comparative Literature at Emory University in Georgia, United States, and Professor of Philosophy at the European Graduate School in Saas-Fee, Switzerland, as well as a member of the International College of Philosophy in Paris. He is a literary critic and philosopher, best known as an expert on deconstruction and the works of Jacques Derrida and Jean-François Lyotard. Bennington has translated many of Derrida's works into English.

Education
Bennington received his B.A., M.A., and D.Phil. from Oxford University.

Teaching positions
He took up a teaching appointment at the University of Sussex at Brighton, where he created an M.A. program in Modern French Thought and twice served as chair of the French department.  Since arriving at Emory in 2001, he has chaired both the French and the Comparative Literature Departments.

Publications
He co-wrote the book Jacques Derrida with Derrida.  Bennington's contribution, "Derridabase", is an attempt to provide a comprehensive explication of Derrida's work.  "Derridabase" appears on the upper two-thirds of the book's pages, while Derrida's contribution, "Circumfession", is written on the lower third of each page.  Derrida's "Circumfession" is, among other things, intended to show how Derrida's work exceeds Bennington's explication: by introducing details about his own circumcision and its possible meanings Derrida shows the impossibility of such a regulated database of his writings.  Many of Bennington's essays on Derrida collected in Legislations, Interrupting Derrida, and Not Half No End, have criticized explanations of Derrida's work attempted by other scholars.  Bennington has also written two monographs on Lyotard, Writing the Event and Late Lyotard, and has also written extensively on Rousseau and Kant, developing original accounts of the "paradox of the legislator" in the former and "interrupted teleology" in the latter.  He is currently writing a deconstructive account of political philosophy.

He has translated a number of works by Derrida and others, and is General Editor (with Peggy Kamuf) of the English translations of Derrida's posthumously published seminars.

He has at times tried to engage members of the British press hostile to Derrida's work and has also attempted to explicate the relationship between deconstruction and analytic philosophy, which has generally had difficulties receiving work by Derrida and others.

Works

Books 
 Bennington, Geoffrey; Attridge, Derek; Young, Robert (1983). Post-structuralism and the Question of History, (ed.)
 Bennington, Geoffrey [1985] (2005). Sententiousness and the Novel: Laying Down the Law in Eighteenth-Century French Fiction,, reprinted as ebook,
 Bennington, Geoffrey [1988] (2005). Lyotard: Writing the Event, reprinted as ebook,
 Bennington, Geoffrey (1991). Jacques Derrida,, w/ Jacques Derrida
 Bennington, Geoffrey (1991). Dudding: des noms de Rousseau,
 Bennington, Geoffrey (1995). Legislations: the Politics of Deconstruction,
 Bennington, Geoffrey (2000). Interrupting Derrida,
 Bennington, Geoffrey (2000). Frontières kantiennes,
 Bennington, Geoffrey (2003). Frontiers: Kant, Hegel, Frege, Wittgenstein, 
 Bennington, Geoffrey (2005). Other Analyses: Reading Philosophy,
 Bennington, Geoffrey (2005). Open Book/Livre Ouvert,
 Bennington, Geoffrey (2005). Deconstruction is Not What You Think...,
 Bennington, Geoffrey (2005). Late Lyotard,
 Bennington, Geoffrey (2010). Not Half No End: Militantly Melancholic Essays in Memory of Jacques Derrida,
 Bennington, Geoffrey (2011). Géographie et autres lectures,
 Bennington, Geoffrey (2016). Scatter I: The Politics of Politics in Foucault, Heidegger, and Derrida,
 Bennington, Geoffrey (2017). Kant on the Frontier: Philosophy, Politics, and the Ends of the Earth,

Journal articles

Translations
 Heidegger: The Question of Being and History Jacques Derrida, 2016
 The Beast and the Sovereign, II Jacques Derrida, 2011
 The Beast and the Sovereign, I Jacques Derrida, 2009
 Veils, Jacques Derrida and Hélène Cixous, 2001
 Jacques Derrida, Jacques Derrida and Geoffrey Bennington, 1993
 The Inhuman: Talks on Time, Jean-François Lyotard, 1991, w/ Rachel Bowlby
Virginia Woolf and the Madness of Language, Daniel Ferrer, 1990, w/ Rachel Bowlby
Of Spirit: Heidegger and the Question, Jacques Derrida, 1989, w/ Rachel Bowlby
The Truth in Painting, Jacques Derrida, 1987, w/ Ian McLeod
The Postmodern Condition, (UK ) (US ) Jean-François Lyotard, 1984, w/ Brian Massumi

See also
List of thinkers influenced by deconstruction

Notes

External links
 Home page at Emory
 Geoffrey Bennington faculty profile at European Graduate School. (Biography, bibliography and articles)
 Electronic publications

20th-century British philosophers
Deconstruction
British literary critics
1956 births
Living people
Academics of the University of Sussex
Academic staff of European Graduate School
Literary critics of French
Comparative literature academics
Translators of Jacques Derrida
Emory University faculty
20th-century translators